Llantrisant Common and Pastures is a  Site of Special Scientific Interest in Llantrisant, Rhondda Cynon Taf, south Wales. It was established in 2000.

The Countryside Council for Wales states that the site has been categorized as a Site of Special Interest for "...its extensive area of acidic marshy grassland in a lowland setting, as well as for smaller areas of species-rich neutral grassland, dry acidic grassland and flush. It is also of special interest for populations of two rare plants: Cornish moneywort (Sibthorpia europaea)  and a liverwort known as bog earwort (Scapania paludicola).

Notes

See also
 List of Sites of Special Scientific Interest in Mid & South Glamorgan

Sites of Special Scientific Interest in Rhondda Cynon Taf
Sites of Special Scientific Interest notified in 2000
Llantrisant